The fourth season of Stargate SG-1, an American-Canadian television series, began airing on June 30, 2000 on Showtime. The fourth season concluded after 22 episodes on February 14, 2001 on British Sky One, which overtook Showtime in mid-season. The series was developed by Brad Wright and Jonathan Glassner. Season four regular cast members include Richard Dean Anderson, Michael Shanks, Amanda Tapping, Christopher Judge, and Don S. Davis.

Production and release
In the scene in "Divide and Conquer" that flashes back to the events in Upgrades, where Carter and O'Neill are trapped on opposite sides of the forcefield, lines were written but the actors chose not to say them. In "Watergate", melted toxic wax was used to give Maybourne a frozen look. Tom McBeath couldn't breathe it in or would have risked his own health. The actual ending of the episode where O'Neill proposes that the two races had just exchanged hostages was not the intended ending, which is why the episode appears to end so abruptly. In "Beneath the Surface", Thera and Jonah were supposed to kiss to confirm that they were in a relationship, but this was dropped because O'Neill had already kissed Carter earlier in the season in "Window of Opportunity".

"Chain Reaction" made many references to the movie The Silence of the Lambs. As Lecter does with Clarice in the movie, Harry Maybourne refers to quid pro quo, should O'Neill really want to get help from him. Another reference is the final telephonic conversation between O'Neill and Maybourne, the latter calling from an exotic place, just as Lecter called Clarice Starling at the end of The Silence of the Lambs. "Double Jeopardy" is the only Stargate SG-1 episode directed by actor Michael Shanks. This episode serves as a sequel to the Season 1 episode "Tin Man", where the robotic SG-1 team first appeared. The artificial Daniel Jackson wears a bandana covering his hair, as he was created when Daniel (and Shanks) had long hair. "Exodus" is the last season finale that ends on a cliffhanger until Season Nine's "Camelot".

"Small Victories" was nominated for a 2001 Emmy Award in the category "Outstanding Special Visual Effects for a Series" and a 2001 Gemini Award in the category "Best Visual Effects". "Tangent" was nominated for a Gemini Award in the category "Best Visual Effects". "The Curse" was nominated for a Leo Award in the category "Best Visual Effects of Dramatic Series" "The Light" won a Leo Award in the category "Best Production Design of Dramatic Series". "Exodus" was nominated for an Emmy Award in the category "Outstanding Special Visual Effects for a Series".

Main cast
 Starring Richard Dean Anderson as Colonel Jack O'Neill
 Michael Shanks as Dr. Daniel Jackson
 Amanda Tapping as Major Samantha Carter
 With Christopher Judge as Teal'c
 And Don S. Davis as Major General George Hammond

Episodes

Episodes in bold are continuous episodes, where the story spans over 2 or more episodes.

References

External links

 Season 4 on GateWorld
 Season 4 on IMDb
 Season 4 on TV.com
 

 04
2000 American television seasons
2001 American television seasons
SG-1 04
2000 Canadian television seasons
2001 Canadian television seasons